Razan is a city in Hamadan Province, Iran.

Razan may also refer to:

Razan, Lorestan, a village
Razan, Markazi, a village
Razan, Amol, a village in Mazandaran Province
Razan, Chalus, a village in Mazandaran Province
Razan, Nur, a village in Mazandaran Province
Razan, Qazvin, a village
Razan, Razavi Khorasan, a village
Razan County
Razan Rural District (Hamadan Province)
Razan Rural District (Lorestan Province)